{{DISPLAYTITLE:C20H22N4O}}
The molecular formula C20H22N4O (molar mass: 334.41 g/mol, exact mass: 334.1794 u) may refer to:

 Difenamizole (AP-14)
 PD-168,077